Action Pact is the seventh album by Canadian rock band Sloan. The album was named after "Youth Action Pact," a song by the 1980s Halifax band Jellyfishbabies. Action Pact was released on August 19, 2003 by ViK Recordings. The album debuted at #11 on the Canadian Albums Chart. The album does not include any songs written by Andrew Scott, and is therefore the only Sloan album that does not include at least one track written by each band member.

Track listing
All songs credited to Sloan. 
 "Gimme That" (Chris Murphy) – 2:39 
 "Live On" (Patrick Pentland) – 3:11
 "Backstabbin'" (Patrick Pentland) – 2:51
 "The Rest of My Life" (Chris Murphy) – 2:45
 "False Alarm" (Jay Ferguson) – 3:47 
 "Nothing Lasts Forever Anymore" (Chris Murphy) – 3:18
 "Hollow Head" (Patrick Pentland) – 3:37
 "Ready for You" (Chris Murphy) – 2:07
 "I Was Wrong" (Patrick Pentland) – 2:52
 "Who Loves Life More?" (Chris Murphy) – 3:26
 "Reach Out" (Patrick Pentland) – 3:28
 "Fade Away" (Jay Ferguson) – 4:46

B-sides
 "Will You Ever Love Me Again?" (Chris Murphy) (US import)
 "Step on It, Jean" (Jay Ferguson) (US import, 7" single)
 "Dirty Nails" (written by Temple Bates/Amy Bowles, and originally performed by Pony Da Look) ("Step on It, Jean" 7" single)

Singles
 "The Rest of My Life" (2003)
 "Live On" (2003)
 "Nothing Lasts Forever Anymore" (2004)

References

2003 albums
Sloan (band) albums
Albums produced by Tom Rothrock
Sony BMG albums